Nematullah Ghaffari is an ethnic Hazara politician from Afghanistan, who was the representative of the people of Helmand province in the 15th and 16th terms of the Afghanistan Parliament.

Early life 
Nematullah Ghaffari was born on 1962 in Lashkargah, Helmand province. He completed his secondary education at "Lashkargah High School" in 1980 and obtained his diploma from Al-Mustafa International University in 1993 in Qom, Iran.

See also 
 List of Hazara people

References 

Living people
1962 births
Hazara politicians
People from Helmand Province